Dugu is a town of Xinle City in western Hebei province, China, located  northeast of downtown Xinle. , it has 14 villages under its administration.

See also
List of township-level divisions of Hebei

References

Township-level divisions of Hebei
Xinle, Hebei